The 2006 Idaho Vandals football team represented the University of Idaho during the 2006 NCAA Division I FBS football season. Idaho competed as a member of the Western Athletic Conference (WAC), and played their home games in the Kibbie Dome, an indoor facility on campus in Moscow, Idaho. In his second stint as the program's head coach, Dennis Erickson led the Vandals to wins in their first three conference games to move to 4–3 overall, Idaho then lost their final five games, all in conference to finish at 4–8 (3–5 in WAC, sixth), their seventh-straight season with a losing record.

Hired in February following the departure of Nick Holt for an assistant's position at USC,  Erickson was previously the head coach of the Vandals from 1982 through 1985, his first collegiate head coaching position, and was most recently the head coach of the NFL's San Francisco 49ers. After just ten months back at Idaho, Erickson departed in December to become the head coach at Arizona State in the Pac-10 Conference.

Schedule

Idaho's reported home attendance for 2006 was 72,717 for five games, an average of 15,543. The maximum was 17,000 for the Boise State game on October 21, and the minimum was 10,435 for San Jose State on November 25, two days after Thanksgiving.

References

External links
Idaho Argonaut – student newspaper – 2006 editions

Idaho
Idaho Vandals football seasons
Idaho Vandals football